This is a list of earthquakes in 2023. Only earthquakes of magnitude 6 or above are included, unless they result in significant damage and/or casualties. All dates are listed according to UTC time. The maximum intensities are based on the Modified Mercalli intensity scale. Earthquake magnitudes are based on data from the USGS.

Compared to other years

By death toll 

Listed are earthquakes with at least 10 dead.

By magnitude 

Listed are earthquakes with at least 7.0 magnitude.

By month

January

February

March

See also 

 
 Lists of 21st-century earthquakes
 List of earthquakes 2021-2030
 Lists of earthquakes by year

References

Notes

Citations 

Earthquakes
Earthquake
2023
 List
2023